William Joseph Sweatt (born September 21, 1988) is an American former professional ice hockey left winger. He played in the National Hockey League (NHL) with the Vancouver Canucks before playing in the Swedish Hockey League (SHL).

Sweatt played junior hockey with the United States National Development Program and college hockey with the Colorado College Tigers. Selected 38th overall in the 2007 NHL Entry Draft by the Chicago Blackhawks, he became a free agent after going unsigned by the club. In 2010, he signed with the Canucks. As a roller hockey player, Sweatt has competed internationally with Team USA, winning a gold medal at the 2006 World InLine Championships. His older brother Lee Sweatt is a former hockey player; the two played with each other with the Colorado College Tigers and the Manitoba Moose.

Early life
Sweatt was born in Elburn, Illinois, a village west of Chicago. He played minor ice hockey with his older brother Lee, in Highland Park, Illinois. As a youth, he played in the 2002 Quebec International Pee-Wee Hockey Tournament with the Chicago Young Americans team. His father was a former football player, while his mother was a hockey fan. Growing up, the family lived in the country and had a paved basement, where the brothers played roller hockey.

Playing career
Sweatt joined the U.S. National Under-18 Team in 2004–05. After two seasons with the program, he joined the college ranks with the Colorado College Tigers of the Western Collegiate Hockey Association (WCHA). During his freshman year, Sweatt skated alongside Lee, who was finishing up his college career with Colorado as a senior defenceman. Following a 26-point effort over 30 games, Sweatt was selected 38th overall in the 2007 NHL Entry Draft by the Chicago Blackhawks. He returned to Colorado to complete his NCAA career, which culminated in a college career-high 15 goals, 18 assists and 33 points over 39 games as a senior in 2009–10. 

In the off-season, Sweatt was traded from the Blackhawks to the Toronto Maple Leafs on June 30, 2010, along with forward Kris Versteeg. Opting not to sign with Toronto, he became a free agent on August 16, 2010. Three days later, he signed a three-year, entry level contract with the Vancouver Canucks worth US$2.7 million, plus performance bonuses. Sweatt joined his brother Lee in the Canucks organization, who had been signed by the team three months prior.

Following the pre-season, the Canucks assigned both Sweatt brothers to their American Hockey League(AHL) affiliate the Manitoba Moose. Together, they became the first pair of brothers to play at the same time for the franchise. Moose head coach Claude Noel described Sweatt in his professional rookie season as a physical player who can forecheck quickly and make plays. Sweatt recorded 46 points (19 goals and 27 assists) over 80 games, ranking second in team-scoring (12 behind winger Sergei Shirokov), as well as ninth among league rookies. During the off-season, Lee was left unsigned by the Canucks organization, splitting the brothers up. Despite signing with the Ottawa Senators, Lee announced his retirement shortly thereafter.

During the Canucks' 2011 training camp, Sweatt was injured during a prospects tournament in Penticton, British Columbia, causing him to miss the team's first two pre-season games in September. After being assigned to the Chicago Wolves, the Canucks' new AHL affiliate, to start the season, he received his first NHL call-up on December 7, 2011. Making his NHL debut the following night against the Montreal Canadiens, he registered two shots on goal and one hit in six minutes and eighteen seconds of ice time; Vancouver won the game 4–3. On March 31, 2013, Sweatt and Nicklas Jensen were recalled from the Wolves by the Canucks.

On July 9, 2013, with his rights still owned by the Canucks, Sweatt signed his first European contract on a one-year contract in Sweden with Brynäs IF of the Swedish Hockey League (SHL).

Sweatt played the next five seasons in the SHL, opting to end his eight-year professional career and return to North America, following the 2017–18 season with HV71.

International play

Sweatt was named Top Forward at the IIHF Under-18 World Championships in 2006, where the United States won gold. He also participated in the 2007 World Junior Ice Hockey Championships for the US, coming home with a bronze medal. While playing roller hockey, Sweatt won a gold medal at the 2006 World InLine Championships.

Career statistics

Regular season and playoffs

International

References

External links

1988 births
Living people
American men's ice hockey left wingers
Brynäs IF players
Chicago Blackhawks draft picks
Chicago Wolves players
Colorado College Tigers men's ice hockey players
HV71 players
Ice hockey players from Illinois
Inline hockey players
Luleå HF players
Manitoba Moose players
Sportspeople from Kane County, Illinois
Vancouver Canucks players
American expatriate ice hockey players in Sweden